Karomatullo Saidov (born 12 October 1999) is a Tajikistani professional football player who currently plays for FC Khatlon.

Career

International
Saidov made his senior team debut on 13 December 2018 against Oman.

Career statistics

International

Statistics accurate as of match played 10 July 2019

References

External links
 

1999 births
Living people
Tajikistani footballers
Tajikistan international footballers
Association football midfielders